The Royal Norwegian Ministry of Industrial Provisioning was a Norwegian ministry that existed from 1917 to 1920.

It was established on 30 April 1917, during the first World War, and ceased to exist on 30 April 1920. Its tasks were transferred to the Ministries of Defence, Finance, Trade and Provisioning.

The heads of the Ministry of Industrial Provisioning were: Torolf Prytz (1917-1918), Nils Ihlen, (1918) and Haakon Hauan (1918-1920).

Ministers

References

Industrial Provisioning
1920 disestablishments in Norway
Government agencies established in 1917
Ministries disestablished in 1920
1917 establishments in Norway